Esnagi Lake is a large "V"-shaped lake in the Unorganized North part of Algoma District, Ontario, Canada. The primary inflows are the Magpie River from Mosambik Lake at the north end of the lake, Tripoli Creek on the west side, and other unnamed creeks. The primary outflow is also the Magpie River, which flows downstream from the south end of the lake at the east switch of the siding at Swanson on the Canadian Pacific Railway transcontinental mainline, and eventually into Lake Superior.

The lake is home to three fishing lodges, two outpost cottages and two private cottages accessible only by rail or float plane.  It has fish species such as walleye, northern pike, perch and whitefish and made Fish'n Canada top ten list of Canadian fishing destinations.

See also
List of lakes in Ontario

References

Lakes of Algoma District